Euphorbia anachoreta is a species of flowering plant in the family Euphorbiaceae, endemic to the Fora Islet of the Savage Islands. This species has been considered a Critically Endangered species due to its highly restricted population size. As most other succulent members of the genus Euphorbia, its trade is regulated under Appendix II of CITES.

In the wild, it grows in the crags of basaltic rocks, where it is sheltered from salty winds.

References

anachoreta
Flora of the Savage Islands
Plants described in 1969
anachoreta